Toxic Holocaust / Midnight is a Split EP by thrash metal bands Midnight and Toxic Holocaust released under Relapse Records. Track 1 is by Toxic Holocaust and track 2 is by Midnight. The album's profits were donated to help the Japanese tsunami victims.

Track listing

Personnel
Toxic Holocaust
 Joel Grind  — vocals, guitars
 Phil Zeller — bass, vocals
 Nick Bellmore — drums

Midnight
 Athenar - vocals, guitars, bass 
 Filey the Kid - guitar
 Count Zigar - drums

Production
 Daniel Shaw - Album cover art

References

2011 EPs
Toxic Holocaust albums
Relapse Records EPs